La Caricature (The Caricature) may refer to:
 La Caricature (1830–1843), a satirical weekly published in Paris between 1830 and 1843 during the July Monarchy
 La Caricature (1880–1904),  a satirical journal that was published in Paris between 1880 and 1904